Plopiş is a commune in Sălaj County, Romania.

Plopiş may refer to several other places in Romania:

 Plopiş, a village in Harghita County
 Plopiş, a village in Maramureș County

See also 
 Plopi (disambiguation)
 Plopu (disambiguation)